Maikel Jose Cleto (born May 1, 1989) is a Dominican professional baseball pitcher who is a free agent. He has played in Major League Baseball (MLB) for the St. Louis Cardinals and Chicago White Sox.

Professional career

New York Mets
He went 1–2 with a 5.03 ERA, one save and 28 strikeouts.

In  Cleto split the season between the Class-A Savannah Sand Gnats and the Class-A Advanced St. Lucie Mets. He had a combined record of 5–12 with a 4.41 ERA, one shutout and 82 strikeouts in 26 games, 23 starts between the two clubs.

Seattle Mariners
On December 11, 2008, Cleto was traded to the Mariners with Aaron Heilman, Endy Chávez, Jason Vargas, Mike Carp and Ezequiel Carrera in exchange for J. J. Putz, Jeremy Reed and Sean Green.

Cleto split the  season between the Rookie-Level Peoria Mariners and the Class-A Clinton LumberKings. He went 0–4 with a 5.54 ERA and 25 strikeouts in nine games, eight starts. He attended spring training with the Mariners but was assigned to the Minor Leagues early in camp. Cleto was placed on the disabled list of July 7 due to back discomfort and made his return on August 15.

St. Louis Cardinals
On December 12, 2010, it was announced Cleto was traded to the St. Louis Cardinals for shortstop Brendan Ryan.

Cleto was activated on June 2, 2011 (the same day Lance Lynn was also called up), directly from AA (Springfield Cardinals) to shore up an overworked bullpen.

Kansas City Royals
Cleto was claimed off waivers to the Kansas City Royals on June 23, 2013. On February 17, 2014, he was designated for assignment by the Royals.

Chicago White Sox
Cleto was claimed off waivers by the Chicago White Sox on February 26, 2014. To make room on the roster the Sox designated infielder Jake Elmore for assignment. Cleto was designated for assignment on May 10 to make room for Frank Francisco on the White Sox roster. He was called back up on August 4, 2014. On February 2, 2016, the Chicago White Sox resigned Cleto to a minor league contract. He was released on March 31, 2016.

Vaqueros Laguna
On May 30, 2016, Cleto signed with the Vaqueros Laguna of the Mexican Baseball League. They released him on July 1, 2016.

Atlanta Braves
On July 3, the Braves signed Cleto to a minor league deal. He was assigned to the AAA Gwinnett Braves. He became a free agent after the season.

Chicago Cubs
On December 13, 2016, Cleto signed a minor league contract with the Chicago Cubs. He was released on March 13, 2017.

Mexican League (2017–2021)
On May 4, 2017, Cleto signed with the Vaqueros Unión Laguna of the Mexican Baseball League. On June 20, 2017, he was traded to the Leones de Yucatán. On March 19, 2018, Cleto was traded back to the Algodoneros de Unión Laguna prior to the beginning of the 2018 season. On July 17, 2018, Cleto was traded back to the Leones de Yucatán. On June 1, 2019, Cleto was loaned to the Toros de Tijuana. On July 2, 2019, he was loaned to the Rieleros de Aguascalientes. On February 27, 2020, Cleto signed with the Piratas de Campeche. Cleto did not play in a game in 2020 due to the cancellation of the LMB season because of the COVID-19 pandemic. On April 7, 2021, Cleto signed with the Algodoneros de Unión Laguna. On October 20, 2021, Cleto was traded back to the Toros de Tijuana. He was released prior to the 2022 season on March 1, 2022.

Pitching style
Cleto is a hard-thrower, wielding a four-seam fastball at 96–99 mph. The fastball is by far his most used pitch, but he also throws three off-speed pitches: a changeup (89–91) to lefties, a slider (84–86) to righties, and a curveball (79–82) to hitters from both sides of the plate.

References

External links

1989 births
Living people
Águilas de Mexicali players
Algodoneros de Unión Laguna players
Arizona League Mariners players
Cañeros de Los Mochis players
Charlotte Knights players
Chicago White Sox players
Clinton LumberKings players
Dominican Republic expatriate baseball players in Mexico
Dominican Republic expatriate baseball players in the United States
Gulf Coast Mets players
High Desert Mavericks players
Major League Baseball pitchers
Major League Baseball players from the Dominican Republic
Memphis Redbirds players
Mexican League baseball pitchers
Omaha Storm Chasers players
Palm Beach Cardinals players
Peoria Javelinas players
Rieleros de Aguascalientes players
Savannah Sand Gnats players
Springfield Cardinals players
Sportspeople from Santo Domingo
St. Louis Cardinals players
St. Lucie Mets players
Tigres del Licey players
Toros de Tijuana players
Vaqueros Laguna players
Yaquis de Obregón players
Gwinnett Braves players
Leones de Yucatán players
Toros del Este players